Hemu was a 16th-century Indian general and king.

Hemu may also refer to:
 HEMU-430X, South Korean high-speed train
 Hemu Adhikari (1919–2003), an Indian cricketer
 Hemu Kalani, a Sindhi revolutionary and freedom fighter
 Techi Hemu, Indian politician
 Haute école de musique de Lausanne, the Conservatory of Lausanne (Switzerland)